Callidrepana hirayamai is a moth in the family Drepanidae. It was first described by Kikujiro Nagano in 1918. It is found in Japan and the Chinese provinces of Fujian and Hunan.

The length of the forewings is 13.5–18 mm for males and 16.5–19 mm for females. Adults are similar to Callidrepana ovata and Callidrepana patrana, but have a dotted rectangular marking at the end of the cell on the forewings. The coloration is similar to patrana, but in many specimens the ground colour is dull greyish yellow.

Subspecies
Callidrepana hirayamai hirayamai (Japan)
Callidrepana hirayamai forcipulata Watson, 1968 (China: Fujian, Hunan)

References

Moths described in 1918
Drepaninae